John Bodkin fitz Dominick was the mayor of Galway from 1638 to 1640.

A son of Dominick Bodkin, he was elected in August 1638. During his term, the town corporation provided finance for the construction of a new market-house. He was the last of the Bodkin mayors of Galway, though a descendant of the Bodkin family, Martin Quinn, was mayor for 2000-2001.

See also
 Tribes of Galway
 Galway

References
 History of Galway, James Hardiman, Galway, 1820.
 Old Galway, Maureen Donovan O'Sullivan, 1942.
 Henry, William (2002). Role of Honour: The Mayors of Galway City 1485-2001. Galway: Galway City Council.  

Mayors of Galway
Politicians from County Galway
17th-century Irish businesspeople